The 1971 New Jersey State Senate Elections was the mid-term election of Republican William Cahill's term as Governor of New Jersey.  Democrats picked up seven Senate seats.  Sixteen incumbents did not seek re-election.

Background

Reapportioning

Legislative districts were redrawn by a 10-member bi-partisan New Jersey Apportionment Commission to reflect population changes following the 1970 U.S. Census. Senators generally (with some exceptions) ran At-Large countywide.

Until 1965, the New Jersey State Senate was composed of 21 senators with each county electing one senator. After the U.S. Supreme Court decision Reynolds v. Sims required legislative districts to be approximately equal in population (a principle known as "one man, one vote"). In 1965, the New Jersey Senate was increased to 29 members, with larger counties given multiple seats and some smaller counties sharing one or two senators.

The map was changed again in 1967, and again in 1971, as the state adjusted to the one man, one vote ruling.

For the 1971 election, two seats were eliminated in District 11 and District 12 (Essex and Hudson counties, respectively). They were replaced by two new seats in the single-member District 4C and District 5 (Burlington and Monmouth counties, respectively). District 6 (now comprising Mercer and Hunterdon County) also switched from electing its senators at-large to electing them from two single-member districts because it became composed of more than one county.

The new districts were divided as follows:

Incumbents not running for re-election

Democratic
Richard J. Coffee (District 6)
Sido L. Ridolfi (District 6)

Republican
Robert E. Kay (District 1)
John L. White (District 3A)
Hugh A. Kelly (District 3B)
William Hiering (District 4A)
Harry L. Sears (District 10)
Geraldo Del Tufo (District 11)
David W. Dowd (District 11)
Alexander Matturri (District 11)
Frank Joseph Guarini (District 12)
Fairleigh Dickinson, Jr. (District 13)
Frank Sciro (District 14)
Ira Schoem (District 14)
Edward Sisco (District 14)

Summary of results by State Senate District

Gains and losses
Two incumbent Republican senators were defeated for re-election:
 Second District: Frank S. Farley (R-Atlantic), lost to Democrat Joseph McGahn, the Mayor of Absecon.
 Eleventh District: Milton Waldor (R-Essex), lost to Democrat Ralph DeRose, a member of the Reapportionment Commission.

One incumbent Republican Senator who was denied party support for another term ran in the General Election as Independent candidates and was defeated; Republicans held this seat:
 Thirteenth District: Willard Knowlton (R-Bergen), succeeded by Republican Harold C. Hollenbeck, an Assemblyman from Bergen County.

No incumbent Democratic senators were defeated for re-election.

Open Seats
Thirteen incumbent Republican senators did not seek re-election in 1971, and Democrats won six of those seats:
 First District: Robert E. Kay (R-Cape May), succeeded by Republican James Cafiero, an Assemblyman from Cape May County.
 Third District, 3A: John L. White (R-Gloucester), succeeded by Republican James Turner, a former Gloucester County Freeholder.
 Third District, 3B: Hugh A. Kelly (R-Camden), succeeded by Democrat Joseph Maressa, an attorney from Gloucester County.
 Fourth District 4A: William Hiering (R-Ocean), succeeded by Republican John F. Brown, an Assemblyman from Ocean County.
 Tenth District: Majority Leader Harry L. Sears (R-Morris, succeeded by Republican Peter W. Thomas, the Morris County Republican Chairman.
 Eleventh District: Geraldo Del Tufo (R-Essex), succeeded by Democrat Wynona Lipman, an Essex County Freeholder.  (Del Tufo instead ran successfully for the Essex County Board of Freeholders. Lipman became the first Black woman to serve in the State Senate.)
 Eleventh District: David W. Dowd (R-Essex), succeeded by Democrat Frank J. Dodd, an Assemblyman from Essex County.
 Eleventh District: Alexander Matturri (R-Essex).  The Matturi seat was eliminated in redistricting and the Fifth District in Monmouth County gained a seat.  Matturi was effectively succeeded by Republican Joseph Azzolina, an Assemblyman from Monmouth County.
 Twelfth District: Frank Joseph Guarini (D-Hudson).  The Guarini seat was eliminated in redistricting and the Fourth District, 4C in Burlington County gained a seat.  Guarini was effectively succeeded by Democrat Edward J. Hughes, an industrialist and engineer from Burlington County.
 Thirteenth District: Fairleigh Dickinson, Jr. (R-Bergen), succeeded by Republican Frederick Wendel, the Mayor of Oradell.
 Fourteenth District: Frank Sciro (R-Passaic), succeeded by Democrat Joseph Lazzara, a Passaic County Freeholder.
 Fourteenth District: Ira Schoem (R-Passaic), succeeded by Democrat William J. Bate, a Passaic County Freeholder.
 Fourteenth District: Edward Sisco (R-Passaic), succeeded by Democrat Joseph Hirkala, an Assemblyman and the Passaic City Clerk.

One incumbent Republican Senator was elected to Congress in 1970 and resigned his State Senate seat in January 1971 to take his seats in the U.S. House of Representatives:
 Fourth District, 4B: Edwin B. Forsythe (R-Burlington), succeeded by Republican Assembly Speaker Barry T. Parker.

One incumbent Republican Senator resigned in 1970 to become a Judge.  His seat was won in a November 1971 Special Election by a Democrat, but Republicans held the seat in the November 1971 General Election for a full term:
 Ninth District: Nicholas LaCorte (R-Union), succeeded by Jerry Fitzgerald English (D-Union) from November 1971 to January 1972, and then by Jerome Epstein (R-Union).

One incumbent Democratic Senator was defeated for renomination in the June primary and Democrats held that seat:
 Twelfth District: Frederick Hauser (D-Hudson), defeated by James P. Dugan, an Assemblyman from Hudson County.

Two incumbent Democratic senators did not seek re-election in 1971.  Democrats won one seat and Republicans won one seat:
Sixth District, 6A: Richard J. Coffee (D-Mercer), succeeded by Republican William Schluter, an Assemblyman from Mercer County.  (Coffee was elected At-Large in 1967; Schluter won the 6A seat, which now included all of Hunterdon and part of Mercer.) 
 Sixth District, 6B: Sido L. Ridolfi (D-Mercer), succeeded by Democrat Joseph P. Merlino, the Trenton City Attorney.  (Ridolfiwas elected At-Large in 1967; Merlino won the 6B seat in 1971.)

Incumbents who were reelected
Five incumbent Democratic senators were re-elected in 1971:
 Seventh District: John A. Lynch, Sr. (D-Middlesex)
 Seventh District: J. Edward Crabiel (D-Middlesex)
 Seventh District: Norman Tanzman (D-Middlesex)
 Twelfth District: William F. Kelly, Jr. (D-Hudson)
 Twelfth District: William Musto (D-Hudson)

Fourteen incumbent Republican senators were re-elected in 1971:
 Third District, 3C: John L. Miller (R-Camden)
 Third District, 3D: Frank C. Italiano  (R-Camden)
 Fifth District: Richard Stout (R-Monmouth)
 Fifth District: Alfred Beadleston, (R-Monmouth)
 Eighth District: Raymond Bateman (R-Somerset)
 Ninth District: Frank X. McDermott (R-Union)
 Ninth District: Matthew John Rinaldo (R-Union)
 Tenth District: Joseph Maraziti (R-Morris)
 Eleventh District: Michael Giuliano (R-Essex)
 Eleventh District: James Wallwork (R-Essex)
 Thirteenth District: Garrett Hagedorn (R-Bergen) 
 Thirteenth District: Joseph Woodcock (R-Bergen)
 Thirteenth District: Alfred Schiaffo (R-Bergen)
 Fifteenth District: Wayne Dumont, Jr. (R-Warren)

Leadership
Republicans chose Raymond Bateman as the Senate President and Alfred Beadleston as Majority Leader; Republicans named J. Edward Crabiel as Minority Leader.

References

1971 New Jersey elections
New Jersey
1971